A fluffer is a person employed to keep a porn performer's penis erect on the set. After setting up the desired angle, the director asks the actors to hold position and calls for the fluffer to "fluff" the actors for the shot. These duties are considered part of the makeup department. While fluffing does not necessarily involve touching the actors, it could entail sexual acts such as fellatio or non-penetrative sex.

According to some pornographic actors, including Aurora Snow, James Deen and Keiran Lee, fluffers are no longer needed, saying that the role might have existed in the past, but disappeared due to medical advancements, such as Viagra and implants, and with advancements in prosthetics. Hunter Skott, who has worked as a fluffer, contended in an interview that they "are only used for a gangbang or bukkake, not for regular [porn] movies". Sloane Steel, formerly of Bangbros.com, said much the same.

Predating the pornographic usage, which came into use in the 1970s, fluffer has been used by the real estate industry to refer to a person that stages homes and as a term for a maid who fluffs pillows, or in general cleans and prepares work equipment.

In popular culture 

In the 1998 video game Fallout 2, it is possible for the player to become a fluffer for a post-apocalyptic studio engaged in the porn industry.

The 2001 film The Fluffer is about a film buff with a crush on a porn star who is straight, for whom he would end up working as a fluffer in gay porn.
 
In episode 3 of season 2 of New Girl entitled "Fluffer", Nick Miller tells the protagonist Jessica Day that he will not be her "emotional fluffer", after he realises that he is providing her sentimental stimulation which allows her to maintain a more active sex life with a recurring character named Sam Sweeney.

The oneiric slasher Knife+Heart follows a group of "low grade" gay pornographers in 1970s France. The film depicts a character named Mouth of Gold, or Mouth, who is a fluffer. In the film, he is a middle-aged man who works for free as he lives with his mother.

References 

Filmmaking occupations
Pornography terminology
Sex workers
Sexual urban legends